In organic chemistry, carbon–hydrogen bond functionalization ( functionalization) is a type of organic reaction in which a carbon–hydrogen bond is cleaved and replaced with a  bond (where X is usually carbon, oxygen, or nitrogen).  The term usually implies that a transition metal is involved in the  cleavage process. Reactions classified by the term typically involve the hydrocarbon first to react with a metal catalyst to create an organometallic complex in which the hydrocarbon is coordinated to the inner-sphere
of a metal, either via an intermediate "alkane or arene complex" or as a transition state leading to a "" intermediate. The intermediate of this first step (known as  activation and sometimes used interchangeably with  functionalization) can then undergo subsequent reactions to produce the functionalized product. Important to this definition is the requirement that during the  cleavage event, the hydrocarbyl species remains associated in the inner-sphere and under the influence of "M". 

As an alternative definition, other authors use the term  functionalization to mean any organic transformation in which the net result is the transformation of a relatively inert  bond into a  bond (i.e., a functional group), irrespective of the reaction mechanism (or with an agnostic attitude towards it).  In particular, this definition does not require a transition metal coordination to the hydrocarbon in the mechanism.  This broader definition includes the narrower definition given above as a subset.  However, this definition would also include iron-catalyzed alkane functionalization reaction that proceed through the oxygen rebound mechanism (e.g. cytochrome P450 enzymes and their synthetic analogues), in which a metal–carbon bond is not believed to be involved.  Likewise, the ligand-based reactivity of many metal carbene species with hydrocarbons would also fall under this category, although some cases are mechanistically ambiguous.  Some authors similarly define  activation broadly as the  cleaving step of any mechanism that results in functionalization of a hydrocarbon group (or any observable consequence of  bond cleavage, like H/D exchange).  Still others maintain the original narrow definition of the term  activation, while using  functionalization in its broader sense.

Classification
Mechanisms for C-H activations can be classified into three general categories: 
(i) oxidative addition, in which a low-valent metal center inserts into a carbon-hydrogen bond, which cleaves the bond and oxidizes the metal.
LnM  + RH  →  LnMR(H)
(ii) Electrophilic activation in which an electrophilic metal attacks the hydrocarbon, displacing a proton:
LnM+  + RH  →  LnMR  +  H+
substrate undergoes an SEAr-type mechanism.
(iii) Sigma-bond metathesis, which proceeds through a "four-centered" transition state in which bonds break and form in a single step:
LnMR  + R'H  →  LnMR'  +  RH

Historic overview
The first C–H activation reaction is often attributed to Otto Dimroth, who in 1902, reported that benzene reacted with mercury(II) acetate (See: organomercury).  Many electrophilic metal centers undergo this Friedel-Crafts-like reaction. Joseph Chatt observed the addition of C-H bonds of naphthalene by Ru(0) complexes.  

Chelation-assisted C-H activations are prevalent. Shunsuke Murahashi reported a cobalt-catalyzed chelation-assisted C-H functionalization of 2-phenylisoindolin-1-one from (E)-N,1-diphenylmethanimine.

In 1969, A.E. Shilov reported that potassium tetrachloroplatinate induced isotope scrambling between methane and heavy water. The pathway was proposed to involve binding of methane to Pt(II). In 1972, the Shilov group was able to produce methanol and methyl chloride in a similar reaction involving a stoichiometric amount of potassium tetrachloroplatinate, catalytic potassium hexachloroplatinate, methane and water. Due to the fact that Shilov worked and published in the Soviet Union during the Cold War era, his work was largely ignored by Western scientists. This so-called Shilov system is today one of the few true catalytic systems for alkane functionalizations.

In some cases, discoveries in C-H activation were being made in conjunction with those of cross coupling. In 1969, Yuzo Fujiwara reported the synthesis of (E)-1,2-diphenylethene from benzene and styrene with Pd(OAc)2 and Cu(OAc)2, a procedure very similar to that of cross coupling. On the category of oxidative addition, M. L. H. Green in 1970 reported on the photochemical insertion of tungsten (as a Cp2WH2 complex) in a benzene C–H bond and George M. Whitesides in 1979 was the first to carry out an intramolecular aliphatic C–H activation

The next breakthrough was reported independently by two research groups in 1982. R. G. Bergman reported the first transition metal-mediated intermolecular C–H activation of unactivated and completely saturated hydrocarbons by oxidative addition. Using a photochemical approach, photolysis of Cp*Ir(PMe3)H2, where Cp* is a pentamethylcyclopentadienyl ligand, led to the coordinatively unsaturated species Cp*Ir(PMe3) which reacted via oxidative addition with cyclohexane and neopentane to form the corresponding hydridoalkyl complexes, Cp*Ir(PMe3)HR,  where R = cyclohexyl and neopentyl, respectively. W.A.G. Graham found that the same hydrocarbons react with Cp*Ir(CO)2 upon irradiation to afford the related alkylhydrido complexes Cp*Ir(CO)HR, where R = cyclohexyl and neopentyl, respectively. In the latter example, the reaction is presumed to proceed via the oxidative addition of alkane to a 16-electron iridium(I) intermediate, Cp*Ir(CO), formed by irradiation of Cp*Ir(CO)2.

The selective activation and functionalization of alkane C–H bonds was reported using a tungsten complex outfitted with pentamethylcyclopentadienyl, nitrosyl, allyl and neopentyl ligands, Cp*W(NO)(η3-allyl)(CH2CMe3).

In one example involving this system, the alkane pentane is selectively converted to the halocarbon 1-iodopentane. This transformation was achieved via the thermolysis of Cp*W(NO)(η3-allyl)(CH2CMe3) in pentane at room temperature, resulting in elimination of neopentane by a pseudo-first-order process, generating an undetectable electronically and sterically unsaturated 16-electron intermediate that is coordinated by an η2-butadiene ligand. Subsequent intermolecular activation of a pentane solvent molecule then yields an 18-electron complex possessing an n-pentyl ligand. In a separate step, reaction with iodine at −60 °C liberates 1-iodopentane from the complex.

Directed C-H activation
Directed-, chelation-assisted-, or "guided" C-H activation involves directing groups that influence regio- and stereochemistry. This is the most useful style of C-H activation in organic synthesis. N,N-dimethylbenzylamine undergoes cyclometalation readily by many transition metals.  A semi-practical implementations involve weakly coordinating directing groups, as illustrated by the Murai reaction.

The mechanism for the Pd-catalyzed C-H activation reactions of 2-phenylpyridine involves a metallacycle intermediate. The intermediate is oxidized to form a PdIV species, followed by reductive elimination to form the C-O bond and release the product.

Borylation
Transforming C-H bonds into C-B bonds through borylation has been thoroughly investigated due to their utility in synthesis (i.e. for cross-coupling reactions). John F. Hartwig reported a highly regioselective arene and alkane borylation catalyzed by a rhodium complex.  In the case of alkanes, exclusive terminal functionalization was observed.

Later, ruthenium catalysts were discovered to have higher activity and functional group compatibility.

Other borylation catalysts have also been developed, including iridium-based catalysts, which successfully activate C-H bonds with high compatibility.

For more information, consult borylation.

Natural gas

Naturally occurring methane is not utilized as a chemical feedstock, despite its abundance and low cost. Current technology makes prodigious use of methane by steam reforming to produce syngas, a mixture of carbon monoxide and hydrogen. This syngas is then used in Fischer-Tropsch reactions to make longer carbon chain products or methanol, one of the most important industrial chemical feedstocks. An intriguing method to convert these hydrocarbons involves C-H activation. Roy A. Periana, for example, reported that complexes containing late transition metals, such as Pt, Pd, Au, and Hg, react with methane (CH4) in H2SO4 to yield methyl bisulfate.  The process has not however been implemented commercially.

Asymmetric C-H activations

 
The total synthesis of lithospermic acid employs guided C-H functionalization late stage to a highly functionalized system. The directing group, a chiral nonracemic imine, is capable of performing an intramolecular alkylation, which allows for the rhodium-catalyzed conversion of imine to the dihydrobenzofuran.

The total synthesis of calothrixin A and B features an intramolecular Pd-catalyzed cross coupling reaction via C-H activation, an example of a guided C-H activation. Cross coupling occurs between aryl C-I and C-H bonds to form a C-C bond.  The synthesis of a mescaline analogue employs the rhodium-catalyzed enantioselective annulation of an aryl imine via a C-H activation.

See also
 Oxidative coupling of methane
 Cross dehydrogenative coupling [CDC reaction]
 Shilov system
 Meta-selective C-H functionalization

Older reviews
Pre-2004

2004-7

Organometallic C–H Bond Activation: An Introduction Alan S. Goldman and Karen I. Goldberg ACS Symposium Series 885, Activation and Functionalization of C–H Bonds, 2004, 1–43

, 

2008-2011

*

2012-2015

Additional sources
Bergman FAQ in Nature on C-H activation (2007)
Literature Presentation by Ramtohul in Stoltz group on applications of C-H activation
Powerpoint on John Bercaw's work
Center for Selective C-H Functionalization

References

Organometallic chemistry
Organic chemistry